The State vs. Radric Davis II: The Caged Bird Sings is the thirty-third solo mixtape by American rapper Gucci Mane. The project serves as a sequel to his sixth studio album The State vs. Radric Davis (2009). It was released on December 25, 2013, by 1017 Records and 101 Distribution. The project features guest appearances from Young Dolph, Migos, Young Scooter, Peewee Longway, Verse Simmonds, Rocko and Young Thug.

Track listing

Charts

References

2013 albums
Gucci Mane albums
Sequel albums
Albums produced by Zaytoven
Albums produced by Honorable C.N.O.T.E.
Albums produced by Drumma Boy
Albums produced by Mike Will Made It
Albums produced by Shawty Redd
Albums produced by Metro Boomin
Albums produced by Southside (record producer)
Albums produced by Nard & B
Albums produced by TM88